Faron Young (February 25, 1932 – December 10, 1996) was an American country music producer, musician, and songwriter from the early 1950s into the mid-1980s. Hits including "If You Ain't Lovin' (You Ain't Livin')" and "Live Fast, Love Hard, Die Young" marked him as a honky-tonk singer in sound and personal style; and his chart-topping singles "Hello Walls" and "It's Four in the Morning" showed his versatility as a vocalist. Known as the Hillbilly Heartthrob, and following a singing cowboy film role as the Young Sheriff, Young's singles charted for more than 30 years. In failing health, he died by suicide at 64 in 1996. Young is a member of the Country Music Hall of Fame.

Early years
Young was born in Shreveport, Louisiana, the youngest of six children of Harlan and Doris Young. He grew up on a dairy farm that his family operated outside the city. Young began singing at an early age, imagining a career as a pop singer. However, after he joined some friends watching Hank Williams perform with nine encores on the Louisiana Hayride, Young switched to country music instead. He performed at the local Optimist Club and was discovered by Webb Pierce, who brought him to star on the Hayride in 1951, then broadcast on KWKH-AM. He graduated from Fair Park High School that year and attended Centenary College of Louisiana.

Career
Young recorded in Shreveport. His first releases were on Philadelphia's Gotham Records. By February 1952, he was signed to Capitol Records, where he recorded for the next ten years. His first Capitol single appeared that spring.

Young moved to Nashville, Tennessee, and recorded his first chart hit, "Goin' Steady" in October 1952. His career was sidetracked when he was drafted into the United States Army the following month. "Goin' Steady" hit the Billboard country charts while Young was in basic training. It peaked at No. 2, and the US Army Band took Young to replace Eddie Fisher on tours—its first country music singer—just as "If You Ain't Lovin'" was hitting the charts. He was discharged in November 1954.

From 1954 to 1962, Young recorded many honky-tonk songs for Capitol, including the first hit version of Don Gibson's "Sweet Dreams". Most famous was "Hello Walls", a Willie Nelson song Young turned into a crossover hit in 1961. It sold over one million copies, and was awarded a gold disc.

During the mid-1950s, Young starred in four low-budget films: Hidden Guns, Daniel Boone, Trail Blazer, Raiders of Old California and Country Music Holiday. He appeared as himself in cameo roles and performances in later country music films and was a frequent guest on television shows throughout his career, including ABC-TV's Ozark Jubilee. His band, the Country Deputies, was one of country music's top bands and they toured for many years. He invested in real estate along Nashville's Music Row in the 1960s and, in 1963, co-founded, with Preston Temple, the trade magazine, Music City News.

The same year, Young switched to Mercury Records and drifted musically, but by the end of the decade he had returned to his sound including "Wine Me Up". Released in 1971, waltz-time ballad "It's Four in the Morning" written by Jerry Chesnut was one of Young's records and his last number one hit, also becoming his only major success in the United Kingdom, where it peaked at No. 3 on the pop charts. By the mid-1970s his records were becoming overshadowed by his behavior, making headlines in 1972 when he was charged with assault for spanking a girl in the audience at a concert in Clarksburg, West Virginia, who he claimed spat on him, and for other later incidents. In the mid-70s, Young was the spokesman for BC Powder.

Young signed with MCA Records in 1979; the association lasted two years. Nashville independent label Step One Records signed him in 1988 where he recorded into the early 1990s (including a duet album with Ray Price), then withdrew from public view. Although country acts including BR549 were putting his music before audiences in the mid-1990s, Young apparently felt the music industry, which had undergone a revolution of sorts in 1991, had mostly rejected him.

Faron Young's son Robyn followed him into the country music business starting in 1975. Robyn was the main headliner at his father's night club, Faron Young's Jailhouse. In the early 1980s Robyn began touring with his father, performing as an opening act.

Personal life
Young briefly dated Billie Jean Jones before she became the second wife of country music superstar Hank Williams. It was through Young that Jones was first introduced to Williams, who went on to wed Williams in October 1952.

In 1952, while Young was stationed at Fort McPherson, he met his future wife Hilda Macon, the daughter of an Army master sergeant and the great-granddaughter of Uncle Dave Macon. The couple married two years later in November 1954 after Young was discharged from the Army. They had four children, sons Damion, Robyn and Kevin, and a daughter Alana.

Young's later life was plagued with bouts of depression and alcoholism. In 1972, Young was arrested and charged with assault for spanking a girl in the audience at a concert in Clarksburg, West Virginia, after claiming she spat on him. Young appeared before a Wood County, West Virginia, justice of the peace and was fined $24, plus $11 in court costs. On the night of December 4, 1984, Young fired a pistol into the kitchen ceiling of his Harbor Island home. When he refused to seek help for his drinking problem, Young and his wife Hilda separated, sold their home, and bought individual houses. When asked at the divorce trial if he feared hurting someone by shooting holes into the ceiling, Young answered "Not whatsoever." The couple divorced after 32 years of marriage in 1986.

A combination of feeling he had been abandoned by country music and despondency over his deteriorating health were cited as possible reasons that Young shot himself on December 9, 1996. He died in Nashville the following day and was cremated. His ashes were spread by his family over Old Hickory Lake outside Nashville at Johnny Cash and June Carter Cash's home while the Cashes were away.

Legacy
In 2000, Young was inducted into the Country Music Hall of Fame.
The cat owned by Peanuts character Frieda was named "Faron" after Young, whom Charles Schulz "admired very much," but made few appearances in the strip.
A live performance video clip of Young's "It's Four in the Morning" was the first music video to air on CMT when it launched on March 6, 1983.
A country song by Tex Garrison mentions Faron Young in his opening lyrics with the lines "Got a stack of records when I was one, listened to Hank Williams and Faron Young."
The Bottle Rockets make a wistful reference to Young in their song "Sometimes Found" on their album Brand New Year.
Prefab Sprout recorded a country-tinged song called "Faron Young" on their album Steve McQueen. The chorus repeats the line "You give me Faron Young four in the morning." The track reached No. 74 in the UK Singles Chart.
Faron's hits "Hello Walls" and "Alone with You" make brief appearances in the movie biography 3: The Dale Earnhardt Story.
The Blazing Zoos' song "Still Up at Five," on their album Chocks Away is a sequel/homage to "It's Four in the Morning."
"I Miss You Already" can be heard in the 2005 Johnny Cash movie biography Walk The Line.

CD reissues

Box sets
In 2012, the UK-based Jasmine Records released a budget-minded 2-CD box set entitled Live Fast, Love Hard, Die Young: The Early Album Collection. The set focused on Young's first four albums. Later in 2012, Real Gone Music released a similar compilation which combined Young's first six albums with key singles.

Two years before Young's death, the German independent record label Bear Family Records released a box set entitled The Classic Years 1952–1962, which showcased Young's early recordings for Capitol. It did not include Young's recordings for Mercury or Step One.

Young's final recordings were released on a CD entitled "Are You Hungry? Eat Your Import," by the record label Showboat Records, which was founded by fellow country music star Liz Anderson.

Discography

Albums
{| class="wikitable"
|-
! Year
! Album
! style="width:45px;"| US Country
! Label
|-
|1957
|Sweethearts or Strangers
| style="text-align:center;"| —
|Capitol T-778
|-
|rowspan=""|1958
|The Object of My Affection
| style="text-align:center;"| —
|Capitol T-1004
|-
|rowspan="3"|1959
|This Is Faron Young!
| style="text-align:center;"| —
|Capitol T-1096
|-
|My Garden of Prayer
| style="text-align:center;"| —
|Capitol T-1185
|-
|Talk About Hits!
| style="text-align:center;"| —
|Capitol T-1245
|-
|1960
|Faron Young Sings the Best of Faron Young
| style="text-align:center;"| —
|Capitol ST-1450
|-
|rowspan="2"|1961
|Hello Walls
| style="text-align:center;"| —
|Capitol ST-1528
|-
|The Young Approach
| style="text-align:center;"| —
|Capitol ST-1634
|-
|rowspan="3"|1963
|All Time Greatest Hits
| style="text-align:center;"| —
|Capitol DT-2037
|-
|This Is Faron
| style="text-align:center;"| —
|Mercury SR-60785
|-
|Aims at the West
| style="text-align:center;"| 11
|Mercury SR-60840
|-
|rowspan="3"|1964
|Story Songs for Country Folks
| style="text-align:center;"| 7
|Mercury SR-60896
|-
|Country Dance Favorites
| style="text-align:center;"| 7
|Mercury SR-60931
|-
|Story Songs of Mountains and Valleys
| style="text-align:center;"| —
|Mercury SR-60931
|-
|rowspan="2"|1965
|Pen and Paper
| style="text-align:center;"| —
|Mercury SR-61007
|-
|Greatest Hits
| style="text-align:center;"| —
|Mercury SR-61047
|-
|1966
|Sings the Songs of Jim Reeves
| style="text-align:center;"| 18
|Mercury SR-61058
|-
|1967
|Unmitigated Gall
| style="text-align:center;"| 18
|Mercury SR-61110
|-
|rowspan="2"|1968
|Greatest Hits Vol. 2
| style="text-align:center;"| 24
|Mercury SR-61143
|-
|Here's Faron Young
| style="text-align:center;"| 35
|Mercury SR-61174
|-
|rowspan="2"|1969
|I've Got Precious Memories
| style="text-align:center;"| 38
|Mercury SR-61212
|-
|Wine Me Up
| style="text-align:center;"| 13
|Mercury SR-61241
|-
|rowspan="2"|1970
|The Best of Faron Young
| style="text-align:center;"| 45
|Mercury SR-61267
|-
|Occasional Wife
| style="text-align:center;"| 31
|Mercury SR-61275
|-
|rowspan="2"|1971
|Step Aside
| style="text-align:center;"| 19
|Mercury SR-61337
|-
|Leavin' and Sayin' Goodbye
| style="text-align:center;"| 23
|Mercury SR-61354
|-
|rowspan="2"|1972
|Its Four in the Morning
| style="text-align:center;"| 11
|Mercury SR-61359
|-
|This Little Girl of Mine
| style="text-align:center;"| 17
|Mercury SR-61364
|-
|rowspan="2"|1973
|This Time the Hurtin's on Me
| style="text-align:center;"| 19
|Mercury SR-61376
|-
|Just What I Had in Mind
| style="text-align:center;"| 26
|Mercury SRM1-674
|-
|rowspan="2"|1974
|Some Kind of a Woman
| style="text-align:center;"| 25
|Mercury SRM1-698
|-
|A Man and His Music
| style="text-align:center;"| 45
|Mercury SRM1-1016
|-
|1976
|I'd Just Be Fool Enough
| style="text-align:center;"| —
|Mercury SRM1-1075
|-
|1977
|The Best of Faron Young Vol. 2
| style="text-align:center;"| 32
|Mercury SRM1-1130
|-
|1978
|That Young Feelin'''
| style="text-align:center;"| —
|Mercury SRM1-5005
|-
|1979
|Chapter Two| style="text-align:center;"| —
|MCA −3092
|-
|1980
|Free and Easy| style="text-align:center;"| —
|MCA – 3212
|-
|rowspan="3"|1987
|Funny How Time Slips Away (with Willie Nelson)
| style="text-align:center;"| —
|Columbia FC – 39484
|-
|Here's to You| style="text-align:center;"| —
|Step One SOR – 0040
|-
|Greatest Hits 1–3| style="text-align:center;"| —
|Step One SOR – 43/44/45
|-
|1988
|Country Christmas| style="text-align:center;"| —
|Step One SOP – 0059
|-
|1990
|Memories That Last (with Ray Price)
| style="text-align:center;"| —
|Step One SOP – 0068
|-
|1993
|Live in Branson| style="text-align:center;"| —
|Laserlight 12137
|}

Singles
{| class="wikitable"
|-
! rowspan="2"| Year
! rowspan="2"| Single
! colspan="4" | Chart positions
! rowspan="2"| Album
|-
! style="width:45px;"| US Country
! style="width:45px;"| US
! style="width:45px;"| AU
! style="width:45px;"| CAN Country
|-
|1951
|"Hot Rod Shot Gun Boogie No 2"
| style="text-align:center;"| —
| style="text-align:center;"| —
| style="text-align:center;"| —
| style="text-align:center;"| —
|rowspan="3"|singles only
|-
|rowspan="6"| 1952
|"You're Just Imagination"
| style="text-align:center;"| —
| style="text-align:center;"| —
| style="text-align:center;"| —
| style="text-align:center;"| —
|-
|"I Heard the Juke Box Playing"
| style="text-align:center;"| —
| style="text-align:center;"| —
| style="text-align:center;"| —
| style="text-align:center;"| —
|-
|"Tattle Tale Tears"
| style="text-align:center;"| —
| style="text-align:center;"| —
| style="text-align:center;"| —
| style="text-align:center;"| —
|This Is Faron Young|-
|"Foolish Pride"
| style="text-align:center;"| —
| style="text-align:center;"| —
| style="text-align:center;"| —
| style="text-align:center;"| —
|rowspan="2"|singles only
|-
|"Saving My Tears for Tomorrow"
| style="text-align:center;"| —
| style="text-align:center;"| —
| style="text-align:center;"| —
| style="text-align:center;"| —
|-
|"Goin' Steady"
| style="text-align:center;"| 2
| style="text-align:center;"| —
| style="text-align:center;"| —
| style="text-align:center;"| —
|This Is Faron Young|-
|rowspan="4"| 1953
|"I Can't Wait (For the Sun to Go Down)"
| style="text-align:center;"| 5
| style="text-align:center;"| —
| style="text-align:center;"| —
| style="text-align:center;"| —
|rowspan="3"|singles only
|-
|"That's What I'd Do for You"
| style="text-align:center;"| —
| style="text-align:center;"| —
| style="text-align:center;"| —
| style="text-align:center;"| —
|-
|"I'm Gonna Tell Santa Claus on You"
| style="text-align:center;"| —
| style="text-align:center;"| —
| style="text-align:center;"| —
| style="text-align:center;"| —
|-
|"Just Married"
| style="text-align:center;"| —
| style="text-align:center;"| —
| style="text-align:center;"| —
| style="text-align:center;"| —
|This Is Faron Young|-
|rowspan="3"|1954
|"They Made Me Fall in Love with You"
| style="text-align:center;"| —
| style="text-align:center;"| —
| style="text-align:center;"| —
| style="text-align:center;"| —
|rowspan="2"|singles only
|-
|"Place for Girls Like You"
| style="text-align:center;"| 8
| style="text-align:center;"| —
| style="text-align:center;"| —
| style="text-align:center;"| —
|-
|"If You Ain't Lovin' (You Ain't Livin')"
| style="text-align:center;"| 2
| style="text-align:center;"| —
| style="text-align:center;"| —
| style="text-align:center;"| —
|rowspan="2"|This Is Faron Young|-
|rowspan="4"|1955
|"Live Fast, Love Hard, Die Young"
| style="text-align:center;"| 1
| style="text-align:center;"| —
| style="text-align:center;"| —
| style="text-align:center;"| —
|-
|"God Bless God"
| style="text-align:center;"| —
| style="text-align:center;"| —
| style="text-align:center;"| —
| style="text-align:center;"| —
|rowspan="2"|singles only
|-
|"Go Back, You Fool"
| style="text-align:center;"| 11
| style="text-align:center;"| —
| style="text-align:center;"| —
| style="text-align:center;"| —
|-
|"It's a Great Life (If You Don't Weaken)"
| style="text-align:center;"| 5
| style="text-align:center;"| —
| style="text-align:center;"| —
| style="text-align:center;"| —
|rowspan="3"|This Is Faron Young|-
|rowspan="4"|1956
|"I've Got Five Dollars and It's Saturday Night"
| style="text-align:center;"| 4
| style="text-align:center;"| —
| style="text-align:center;"| —
| style="text-align:center;"| —
|-
|"Sweet Dreams"
| style="text-align:center;"| 2
| style="text-align:center;"| —
| style="text-align:center;"| —
| style="text-align:center;"| —
|-
|"Turn Her Down"
| style="text-align:center;"| 9
| style="text-align:center;"| —
| style="text-align:center;"| —
| style="text-align:center;"| —
|rowspan="7"|singles only
|-
|"I Miss You Already (And You're Not Even Gone)"
| style="text-align:center;"| 5
| style="text-align:center;"| —
| style="text-align:center;"| —
| style="text-align:center;"| —
|-
|rowspan="4"|1957
|"The Shrine of St. Cecilia"
| style="text-align:center;"| 15
| style="text-align:center;"| 96
| style="text-align:center;"| —
| style="text-align:center;"| —
|-
|"Love Has Finally Come My Way"
| style="text-align:center;"| 12
| style="text-align:center;"| —
| style="text-align:center;"| —
| style="text-align:center;"| —
|-
|"Vacation's Over"
| style="text-align:center;"| —
| style="text-align:center;"| —
| style="text-align:center;"| —
| style="text-align:center;"| —
|-
|"Locket"
| style="text-align:center;"| —
| style="text-align:center;"| —
| style="text-align:center;"| —
| style="text-align:center;"| —
|-
|rowspan="4"|1958
|"I Can't Dance"
| style="text-align:center;"| —
| style="text-align:center;"| —
| style="text-align:center;"| —
| style="text-align:center;"| —
|-
|"Alone with You"
| style="text-align:center;"| 1
| style="text-align:center;"| 51
| style="text-align:center;"| —
| style="text-align:center;"| —
|Sings the Best|-
|"That's the Way I Feel"
| style="text-align:center;"| 9
| style="text-align:center;"| —
| style="text-align:center;"| —
| style="text-align:center;"| —
|rowspan="2"|singles only
|-
|"Last Night at a Party"
| style="text-align:center;"| 20
| style="text-align:center;"| —
| style="text-align:center;"| —
| style="text-align:center;"| —
|-
|rowspan="3"|1959
|"That's the Way It's Gotta Be"
| style="text-align:center;"| 14
| style="text-align:center;"| —
| style="text-align:center;"| —
| style="text-align:center;"| —
|rowspan="4"|Sings the Best|-
|"Country Girl"
| style="text-align:center;"| 1
| style="text-align:center;"| —
| style="text-align:center;"| —
| style="text-align:center;"| —
|-
|"Riverboat"
| style="text-align:center;"| 4
| style="text-align:center;"| 83
| style="text-align:center;"| —
| style="text-align:center;"| —
|-
|rowspan="3"|1960
|"Your Old Used to Be"
| style="text-align:center;"| 5
| style="text-align:center;"| —
| style="text-align:center;"| —
| style="text-align:center;"| —
|-
|"There's Not Any Like You Left"
| style="text-align:center;"| 21
| style="text-align:center;"| —
| style="text-align:center;"| —
| style="text-align:center;"| —
|rowspan="3"|Hello Walls|-
|"Forget the Past"
| style="text-align:center;"| 20
| style="text-align:center;"| —
| style="text-align:center;"| —
| style="text-align:center;"| —
|-
|rowspan="2"|1961
|"Hello Walls"
| style="text-align:center;"| 1
| style="text-align:center;"| 12
| style="text-align:center;"| 69
| style="text-align:center;"| —
|-
|"Backtrack"
| style="text-align:center;"| 8
| style="text-align:center;"| 89
| style="text-align:center;"| 70
| style="text-align:center;"| —
|rowspan="2"|The Young Approach|-
|rowspan="3"|1962
|"Three Days"
| style="text-align:center;"| 7
| style="text-align:center;"| —
| style="text-align:center;"| —
| style="text-align:center;"| —
|-
|"The Comeback"
| style="text-align:center;"| 4
| style="text-align:center;"| —
| style="text-align:center;"| —
| style="text-align:center;"| —
|single only
|-
|"Down by the River"
| style="text-align:center;"| 9
| style="text-align:center;"| —
| style="text-align:center;"| —
| style="text-align:center;"| —
|All Time Greatest Hits|-
|rowspan="4"|1963
|"The Yellow Bandana"
| style="text-align:center;"| 4
| style="text-align:center;"| 114
| style="text-align:center;"| 65
| style="text-align:center;"| —
|rowspan="3"|This Is Faron|-
|"I've Come to Say Goodbye"
| style="text-align:center;"| 30
| style="text-align:center;"| —
| style="text-align:center;"| —
| style="text-align:center;"| —
|-
|"We've Got Something in Common"
| style="text-align:center;"| 13
| style="text-align:center;"| —
| style="text-align:center;"| —
| style="text-align:center;"| —
|-
|"You'll Drive Me Back (Into Her Arms Again)"
| style="text-align:center;"| 10
| style="text-align:center;"| —
| style="text-align:center;"| —
| style="text-align:center;"| —
|rowspan="2"|singles only
|-
|rowspan="4"|1964
|"Keeping Up with the Joneses" (with Margie Singleton)
| style="text-align:center;"| 5
| style="text-align:center;"| —
| style="text-align:center;"| —
| style="text-align:center;"| —
|-
|"Old Courthouse"
| style="text-align:center;"| 48
| style="text-align:center;"| —
| style="text-align:center;"| —
| style="text-align:center;"| —
|Story Songs for Country Folks|-
|"Another Woman's Man – Another Man's Woman"(with Margie Singleton)
| style="text-align:center;"| 38
| style="text-align:center;"| —
| style="text-align:center;"| —
| style="text-align:center;"| —
|single only
|-
|"My Friend on the Right"
| style="text-align:center;"| 11
| style="text-align:center;"| —
| style="text-align:center;"| —
| style="text-align:center;"| —
|Story Songs of Mountains and Valleys|-
|rowspan="3"|1965
|"Walk Tall"
| style="text-align:center;"| 10
| style="text-align:center;"| —
| style="text-align:center;"| —
| style="text-align:center;"| —
|rowspan="2"|Greatest Hits|-
|"Nothing Left to Lose"
| style="text-align:center;"| 34
| style="text-align:center;"| —
| style="text-align:center;"| —
| style="text-align:center;"| —
|-
|"My Dreams"
| style="text-align:center;"| 14
| style="text-align:center;"| —
| style="text-align:center;"| —
| style="text-align:center;"| —
|rowspan="4"|Unmitigated Gall|-
|rowspan="2"|1966
|"You Don't Treat Me Right"
| style="text-align:center;"| —
| style="text-align:center;"| —
| style="text-align:center;"| —
| style="text-align:center;"| —
|-
|"Unmitigated Gall"
| style="text-align:center;"| 7
| style="text-align:center;"| —
| style="text-align:center;"| —
| style="text-align:center;"| —
|-
|rowspan="2"|1967
|"I Guess I Had Too Much to Dream Last Night"
| style="text-align:center;"| 48
| style="text-align:center;"| —
| style="text-align:center;"| —
| style="text-align:center;"| —
|-
|"Wonderful World of Women"
| style="text-align:center;"| 14
| style="text-align:center;"| —
| style="text-align:center;"| —
| style="text-align:center;"| —
|Greatest Hits Vol. 2|-
|rowspan="2"|1968
|"She Went a Little Bit Farther"
| style="text-align:center;"| 14
| style="text-align:center;"| —
| style="text-align:center;"| —
| style="text-align:center;"| 32
|rowspan="2"|Here's Faron Young|-
|"I Just Came to Get My Baby"
| style="text-align:center;"| 8
| style="text-align:center;"| —
| style="text-align:center;"| —
| style="text-align:center;"| 1
|-
|rowspan="3"|1969
|"I've Got Precious Memories"
| style="text-align:center;"| 25
| style="text-align:center;"| —
| style="text-align:center;"| —
| style="text-align:center;"| —
|I've Got Precious Memories|-
|"Wine Me Up"
| style="text-align:center;"| 2
| style="text-align:center;"| —
| style="text-align:center;"| —
| style="text-align:center;"| 3
|rowspan="2"|Wine Me Up|-
|"Your Time's Coming"
| style="text-align:center;"| 4
| style="text-align:center;"| —
| style="text-align:center;"| —
| style="text-align:center;"| —
|-
|rowspan="3"|1970
|"Occasional Wife"
| style="text-align:center;"| 6
| style="text-align:center;"| —
| style="text-align:center;"| —
| style="text-align:center;"| 15
|rowspan="2"|Occasional Wife|-
|"If I Ever Fall in Love (With a Honky Tonk Girl)"
| style="text-align:center;"| 4
| style="text-align:center;"| —
| style="text-align:center;"| —
| style="text-align:center;"| 2
|-
|"Goin' Steady"
| style="text-align:center;"| 5
| style="text-align:center;"| —
| style="text-align:center;"| —
| style="text-align:center;"| 8
|rowspan="2"|Step Aside|-
|rowspan="3"|1971
|"Step Aside"
| style="text-align:center;"| 6
| style="text-align:center;"| —
| style="text-align:center;"| —
| style="text-align:center;"| 11
|-
|"Leavin' and Sayin' Goodbye"
| style="text-align:center;"| 9
| style="text-align:center;"| —
| style="text-align:center;"| —
| style="text-align:center;"| 11
|Leavin' and Sayin' Goodbye|-
|"It's Four in the Morning"
| style="text-align:center;"| 1
| style="text-align:center;"| 92
| style="text-align:center;"| 9
| style="text-align:center;"| 1
|It's Four in the Morning|-
|rowspan="2"|1972
|"This Little Girl of Mine"
| style="text-align:center;"| 5
| style="text-align:center;"| —
| style="text-align:center;"| —
| style="text-align:center;"| 3
|rowspan="2"|This Little Girl of Mine|-
|"Woman's Touch"
| style="text-align:center;"| —
| style="text-align:center;"| —
| style="text-align:center;"| —
| style="text-align:center;"| —
|-
|rowspan="2"|1973
|"She Fights That Lovin' Feeling"
| style="text-align:center;"| 15
| style="text-align:center;"| —
| style="text-align:center;"| —
| style="text-align:center;"| 6
|This Time The Hurtin's on Me|-
|"Just What I Had in Mind"
| style="text-align:center;"| 9
| style="text-align:center;"| —
| style="text-align:center;"| —
| style="text-align:center;"| 9
|Just What I Had in Mind|-
|rowspan="3"|1974
|"Some Kind of a Woman"
| style="text-align:center;"| 8
| style="text-align:center;"| —
| style="text-align:center;"| —
| style="text-align:center;"| 6
|rowspan="2"|Some Kind of a Woman|-
|"The Wrong in Loving You"
| style="text-align:center;"| 20
| style="text-align:center;"| —
| style="text-align:center;"| —
| style="text-align:center;"| 22
|-
|"Another You"
| style="text-align:center;"| 23
| style="text-align:center;"| —
| style="text-align:center;"| —
| style="text-align:center;"| —
|A Man and His Music|-
|rowspan="2"|1975
|"Here I Am in Dallas"
| style="text-align:center;"| 16
| style="text-align:center;"| —
| style="text-align:center;"| —
| style="text-align:center;"| 49
|rowspan="2"|The Best of Faron Young Vol. 2|-
|"Feel Again"
| style="text-align:center;"| 21
| style="text-align:center;"| —
| style="text-align:center;"| —
| style="text-align:center;"| 15
|-
|rowspan="2"|1976
|"I'd Just Be Fool Enough"
| style="text-align:center;"| 33
| style="text-align:center;"| —
| style="text-align:center;"| —
| style="text-align:center;"| —
|I'd Just Be Fool Enough|-
|"(The Worst You Ever Gave Me Was) The Best I Ever Had"
| style="text-align:center;"| 30
| style="text-align:center;"| —
| style="text-align:center;"| —
| style="text-align:center;"| —
|The Best of Faron Young Vol. 2|-
|1977
|"Crutches"
| style="text-align:center;"| 25
| style="text-align:center;"| —
| style="text-align:center;"| —
| style="text-align:center;"| —
|rowspan="2"|That Young Feelin'|-
|1978
|"Loving Here and Living There and Lying in Between"
| style="text-align:center;"| 38
| style="text-align:center;"| —
| style="text-align:center;"| —
| style="text-align:center;"| —
|-
|rowspan="2"|1979
|"The Great Chicago Fire"
| style="text-align:center;"| 67
| style="text-align:center;"| —
| style="text-align:center;"| —
| style="text-align:center;"| 30
|rowspan="2"|Chapter Two|-
|"That Over Thirty Look"
| style="text-align:center;"| 69
| style="text-align:center;"| —
| style="text-align:center;"| —
| style="text-align:center;"| 68
|-
|rowspan="2"|1980
|"(If I'd Only Known) It Was the Last Time"
| style="text-align:center;"| 56
| style="text-align:center;"| —
| style="text-align:center;"| —
| style="text-align:center;"| 74
|Free and Easy|-
|"Tearjoint"
| style="text-align:center;"| 72
| style="text-align:center;"| —
| style="text-align:center;"| —
| style="text-align:center;"| —
|rowspan="3"|singles only
|-
|rowspan="2"|1981
|"Until the Bitter End"
| style="text-align:center;"| 88
| style="text-align:center;"| —
| style="text-align:center;"| —
| style="text-align:center;"| —
|-
|"Pull Up a Pillow"
| style="text-align:center;"| —
| style="text-align:center;"| —
| style="text-align:center;"| —
| style="text-align:center;"| —
|-
|1982
|"He Stopped Loving Her Today"
| style="text-align:center;"| —
| style="text-align:center;"| —
| style="text-align:center;"| —
| style="text-align:center;"| —
|"Black Tie Country"
|-
|rowspan="2"|1988
|"Stop and Take the Time"
| style="text-align:center;"| 100
| style="text-align:center;"| —
| style="text-align:center;"| —
| style="text-align:center;"| —
|-
|"Here's to You"
| style="text-align:center;"| 87
| style="text-align:center;"| —
| style="text-align:center;"| —
| style="text-align:center;"| —
|-
|1989
|"It's Four in the Morning"
| style="text-align:center;"| —
| style="text-align:center;"| —
| style="text-align:center;"| —
| style="text-align:center;"| —
|Greatest Hits 1–3|-
|1991
|"Just an Ol' Heartache"
| style="text-align:center;"| —
| style="text-align:center;"| —
| style="text-align:center;"| —
| style="text-align:center;"| —
|single only
|-
|rowspan="3"|1992
|"Memories That Last" (with Ray Price)
| style="text-align:center;"| —
| style="text-align:center;"| —
| style="text-align:center;"| —
| style="text-align:center;"| —
|rowspan="2"|Memories That Last|-
|"Too Big to Fight" (with Ray Price)
| style="text-align:center;"| —
| style="text-align:center;"| —
| style="text-align:center;"| —
| style="text-align:center;"| —
|-
|"Christmas Song"
| style="text-align:center;"| —
| style="text-align:center;"| —
| style="text-align:center;"| —
| style="text-align:center;"| —
|Country Christmas|}

B-sides

Guest singles

Music videos

Filmography
1956 Hidden Guns1956 Daniel Boone, Trail Blazer1957 Raiders of Old California1958 Country Music Holiday1966 Second Fiddle to a Steel Guitar1966 Nashville Rebel1967 What Am I Bid?1967 The Road to Nashville1977 That's CountryFilm depiction
Actor Fred Parker Jr. portrayed Young in the biopic I Saw the Light'', released on March 25, 2016.

Notes

References
., pp. 606–7.
Diekman, Diane. "Live Fast, Love Hard: The Faron Young Story." Urbana and Chicago: University of Illinois Press, 2007, p. 27.

External links

Faron Young at the Country Music Hall of Fame
Faron Young biography and links
Faron Young biography at CMT.com
Faron Young obituary at CountryStandardTime.com

1932 births
1996 deaths
1996 suicides
American country singer-songwriters
American male singer-songwriters
Country Music Hall of Fame inductees
Grand Ole Opry members
Musicians from Shreveport, Louisiana
Fair Park High School alumni
Suicides by firearm in Tennessee
20th-century American singers
Singer-songwriters from Louisiana
Capitol Records artists
Mercury Records artists
Country musicians from Louisiana
Country musicians from Tennessee
20th-century American male singers
Singer-songwriters from Tennessee